Germany participated at the 2018 Summer Youth Olympics in Buenos Aires, Argentina from 6 October to 18 October 2018.

Medalists
Medals awarded to participants of mixed-NOC teams are represented in italics. These medals are not counted towards the individual NOC medal tally.

| width="22%" align="left" valign="top" |

Archery

Germany qualified one archer based on its performance at the 2017 World Archery Youth Championships. Later, Germany qualified a female archer based on its performance at the 2018 European Youth Championships.

Individual

Athletics

Boys
Track and road events

Field events

Girls
Track and road events

Field events

Badminton

Germany qualified two players based on the Badminton Junior World Rankings.

 Boys' singles – Lukas Resch (1. BC Beuel)
 Girls' singles – Ann-Kathrin Svenja Spöri (TuS Geretsried)

Singles

Mixed

Basketball

3x3 tournament

Germany qualified a girls' team based on the U18 3x3 National Federation Ranking.

 Girls' tournament – 1 team of 4 athletes: Helena Paula Eckerle (BC Saarlouis / TV Saarlouis Royals), Emma Eichmeyer, Emily Beatrice Enochs (both Osnabrücker SC), Michaela Kucera (TSV Grünberg)

Group stage

Shoot-out contest

Beach volleyball

 Boys' tournament – Filip John (FC Schüttorf), Lukas Pfretzschner (VC Olympia Berlin)

Canoeing

Germany qualified three boats based on its performance at the 2018 World Qualification Event.

Boys

Girls

Cycling

Germany qualified a mixed BMX racing team based on its ranking in the Youth Olympic Games BMX Junior Nation Rankings. They also qualified two athletes in BMX freestyle based on its performance at the 2018 Urban Cycling World Championship.

 Mixed BMX racing team – Aron Lukas Beck (SZ Kornwestheim), Julia Möhser (BMX Team Cottbus)
 Mixed BMX freestyle – Evan Brandes (Mellowpark Berlin), Lara Marie Lessmann (Mellowpark Berlin)

Mixed BMX freestyle park

Mixed BMX racing

Diving

Fencing

Germany qualified two athletes based on its performance at the 2018 Cadet World Championship.

 Boys' Épée – Paul Veltrup (Fecht Club Krefeld)
 Boys' Sabre – Antonio Heathcock (TSG Eislingen)

Team

Golf

 Boys' individual – Lukas Bastian Buller (Frankfurter Golf Club)
 Girls' individual – Paula Friedericke Kirner (Kiawah Golfpark Riedstadt)
 Mixed team – Lukas Bastian Buller, Paula Friedericke Kirner

Individual

Team

Gymnastics

Artistic
Germany qualified two gymnasts based on its performance at the 2018 European Junior Championship.

 Boys' artistic individual all-around – Daniel Schwed (SC Berlin)
 Girls' artistic individual all-around – Lisa Zimmermann (TuS Chemnitz-Altendorf)

Boys

Girls

Rhythmic
Germany qualified one rhythmic gymnast based on its performance at the European qualification event.

 Girls' rhythmic individual all-around – Lilly Rotärmel (1. VfL Fortuna Marzahn)

Multidiscipline

Judo

 Girls' Individual – Raffaela Regina Igl (TSV Abensberg)

Individual

Team

Modern pentathlon

 Boys' individual – Pele Uibel (Wasserfreunde Spandau)

Roller speed skating

Germany qualified one roller skater based on its performance at the 2018 Roller Speed Skating World Championship.

 Girls' combined speed event – Angelina Otto (RSV Blau-Weiss Gera)

Rowing

Germany qualified two boats based on its performance at the 2017 World Junior Rowing Championships.

 Boys' pair – Jasper Elias Angl (RV Neptun Konstanz), Elias Nikolaus Kun (Tübinger RV „Fidelia“)
 Girls' single sculls – Tabea Kuhnert (SC Magdeburg)

Qualification Legend: FA=Final A (medal); FB=Final B (non-medal); FC=Final C (non-medal); FD=Final D (non-medal); SA/B=Semifinals A/B; SC/D=Semifinals C/D; R=Repechage

Sailing

Germany qualified one boat based on its performance at the 2018 IKA Twin Tip Racing World Championships. They also qualified one boat based on its performance at the 2018 Nacra 15 European Qualifiers.

 Girls' IKA Twin Tip Racing – Alina Lisa Kornelli (WSC Starnberg/Reichersbeuern)
 Mixed Nacra 15 – Romy Felicitas Mackenbrock (NRV Münster), Silas Mühle (HSC Hamburg)

Shooting

Germany qualified two sport shooters based on its performance at the 2017 European Championships. Germany later qualified two more sport shooter based on its performance at the 2018 European Championships.

 Boys' 10m Air Rifle – Maximilian Benedikt Ulbrich (SG Wilzhofen)
 Boys' 10m Air Pistol – Jan Luca Karstedt (Schützenverein Stinstedt)
 Girls' 10m Air Rifle – Anna Janßen (SSG Kevelaer)
 Girls' 10m Air Pistol – Vanessa Seeger (USK Fallersleben)

Individual

Team

Sport climbing

Germany qualified one sport climber based on its performance at the 2017 World Youth Sport Climbing Championships.

 Girls' combined – 1 quota (Hannah Luisa Meul) (DAV Sektion Rheinland-Köln)

Swimming

Boys

Girls

Mixed

Table tennis

Germany qualified two table tennis players based on its performance at the Road to Buenos Aires (North America) series.

 Boys' singles – Cédric Meissner (TuS Celle)
 Girls' singles – Franziska Schreiner (TV Hofstetten)

Singles

Team

Qualification Legend: Q=Main Bracket (medal); qB=Consolation Bracket (non-medal)

Taekwondo

 Girls' 55 kg – Vanessa Bettina Beckstein (SV Nennslingen)

Triathlon

Germany qualified two athletes based on its performance at the 2018 European Youth Olympic Games Qualifier.

 Boys' individual – Henry Christopher Graf (MTV Kronberg)
 Girls' individual – Marie Horn (SK Ramsau)

Individual

Relay

Wrestling

 Girls' Freestyle −57 kg – Anastasia Blayvas (KFC Leipzig)

References

External links 
 Official announcement of all athletes by NOC
 Same by organizers 

2018 in German sport
Nations at the 2018 Summer Youth Olympics
Germany at the Youth Olympics